Aleksandr Krutskevich (Олександр Круцкевич, born 13 November 1980) is a retired Ukrainian professional footballer who played as a defender, last for Araz-Naxçıvan in the Azerbaijan First Division. Krutskevich played in the UEFA Intertoto Cup 2008.

Krutskevich began his playing career with FC Shakhtar-2 Donetsk.

Krutskevich was made a free agent when Araz-Naxçıvan folded and withdrew from the Azerbaijan Premier League on 17 November 2014.

References

External links

1980 births
Living people
Kazakhstani footballers
Ukrainian footballers
Association football defenders
FC Feniks-Illichovets Kalinine players
FC Zirka Kropyvnytskyi players
Zhejiang Yiteng F.C. players
China League One players
Expatriate footballers in Latvia
Expatriate footballers in China
Expatriate footballers in Azerbaijan
Araz-Naxçıvan PFK players